The 1990–91 season of the Balkans Cup club tournament was the 27th season of the competition. It was won by Romanian side Inter Sibiu in the final against Yugoslav Budućnost Titograd for their first title in the competition.

Quarter-finals

|}

First leg

Second leg

Budućnost won 2–1 on aggregate.

OFI won 2–1 on aggregate.

Semi-finals

|}

First leg

Second leg

Galatasaray 1–1 Budućnost on aggregate. Budućnost won on away goals.

Inter Sibiu 2–2 OFI Crete on aggregate. Inter Sibiu won on away goals.

Finals

|}

First leg

Second leg

References

1990–91
1990–91 in European football
1990–91 in Albanian football
1990–91 in Bulgarian football
1990–91 in Greek football
1990–91 in Turkish football
1990–91 in Yugoslav football